Kuwait International Bank (KIB) is an Islamic bank located in Kuwait City, founded in 1973. It offers various Islamic banking and finance services for individuals and corporate customers.

It is a specialised bank regulated by the Central Bank of Kuwait and listed on the Kuwait Stock Exchange.

See also 
List of banks in Kuwait

References

External links 
KIB Homepage
Profile on 4-traders.com

Banks of Kuwait
Islamic banks
Banks established in 1967
Companies based in Kuwait City
Companies listed on the Boursa Kuwait
Kuwaiti companies established in 1967